The Scotland national under-18 rugby union team is the under-18 team of the Scotland national rugby union team in the sport of rugby union.

History
Under-18 became a recognised age-grade in European rugby in 2004.

European Championship
Scotland took part in the early editions of the European Under-18 Rugby Union Championship, coming third in 2005 and fourth in 2006, on both occasions playing Italy for third place. The team, after this did not take part in the competition again until 2011. Having missed out on participating in the elite division during the qualifying, the team was grouped in the tier-two first division. It won this division convincingly through victories over Romania and Germany, meeting Italy once more in the final, where Scotland won 17–12.

Honours
 European Under-18 Rugby Union Championship
 First Division Champions: 2011

European championship

Positions
The team's final positions in the European championship:

See also

Men's National teams

Senior
 Scotland national rugby union team
 Scotland A national rugby union team
 Scotland national rugby sevens team

Development
 Scotland B national rugby union team
 Scotland Club XV

Age Grades
 Scotland national under-21 rugby union team
 Scotland national under-20 rugby union team
 Scotland national under-19 rugby union team
 Scotland national under-18 rugby union team
 Scotland national under-17 rugby union team
 Scotland national under-16 rugby union team

Women's National teams

Senior
 Scotland women's national rugby union team
 Scotland women's national rugby union team (sevens)

References

External links
 

Under18
Rugby union